Mushtaq Ahmed Zargar (born 1967, also known as Mushtaq Latram) is a Kashmiri militant active in the Kashmiri insurgency, and founder of the militant outfit Al-Umar Mujahedeen. He spent considerable time in an Indian prison and was released in the aftermath of the Indian Airlines flight 814 hijacking. He currently lives in Pakistan.

Early life and career

Zargar grew up in the Nowhatta area of Srinagar in Kashmir Valley. He joined the Jammu Kashmir Liberation Front in 1988, encouraged by its founder Ashfaq Majeed Wani, and allegedly left for combat training in Azad Kashmir. He returned to Jammu and Kashmir in 1989.

On 12 December 1989 Zargar was one of the members who carried out kidnapping of Rubaiya Sayeed, the daughter of the newly appointed Home Minister of India Mufti Mohammad Sayeed. The kidnappers demanded the release of five of their comrades in exchange for Rubaiya Sayeed’s release. The government accepted their demands.

After Wani's death in March 1990, he fell out with Hamid Sheikh and Yasin Malik, Wani's successors, and in 1991 formed his own militant group which he called Al-Umar Mujahideen.
 
Over the years, at least three dozen murder cases were registered against Zargar in Srinagar, including for alleged killings of high-ranking Indian officers. Zargar was arrested on 15 May 1992 and imprisoned. He was released from jail on 31 December 1999 as part of the Indian Airlines Flight 814 hostage deal and provided safe passage to Pakistan. Shortly after Zargar revived Al-Umar Mujahideen in Muzaffarabad.   
 
Zargar was reportedly arrested by Pakistani authorities in 2002 but as of 2007, he was living in Muzaffarabad without any restrictions.

Notes

External links
 Profile of Al-Umar Mujahideen
 Profile of Mushtaq Ahmed Zargar

1967 births
Living people
Kashmiri militants
Indian Islamists
Indian expatriates in Pakistan
Members of jihadist groups
Kashmiri Islamists